John McKinlay (26 August 1819 – 31 December 1872) was a Scottish-born Australian explorer and cattle grazier, and leader of the South Australian Burke Relief Expedition - one of the search parties for the Burke and Wills expedition. McKinlay was also a member of Charles Sturt's Central Exploring Expedition from 1844-1845. The town of McKinlay in north western Queensland is named after him.

Early life
On 16 August 1819, John McKinlay was born at Sandbank on the River Clyde, in county Argyle and Bute, Scotland. He was the third son of Dugald McKinlay, a merchant, and Catherine née McKellar. John McKinlay was educated at Dalinlongart School and migrated to New South Wales, Australia with his brother Alexander in 1836.
The brothers worked with a squatter uncle until 1840 and afterwards took up a property called "Yambro" on Lake Victoria between the Darling River and the South Australian border. John McKinlay was interested in the Indigenous Australians who inhabited the area, and his knowledge of their ways was of great use later when he became an explorer.

In 1844, at the age of 25, John McKinlay was selected to be a part of Charles Sturt's Central Australian Exploring Expedition. McKinlay successfully participated in Sturt's expedition from 1844-1845, which gave him exploration experience of Australia, which at the time was a fairly foreign country to him.

South Australian Burke Relief Expedition
McKinlay was chosen by the South Australian House of Assembly in August 1861 to lead an expedition to search for the Burke and Wills expedition party, whose fate was unknown. McKinlay left Adelaide on 16 August 1861 with nine other men, 70 sheep, two packhorses and four camels. On 20 October 1861 the grave of a European, supposed to be Charles Gray, was found near Cooper Creek. However, after John King, the sole survivor of the Burke and Wills expedition, had recounted the events it was discovered that Charles Gray died north of Cooper Creek, near what is today known as Coongie Lake. The remains that McKinlay found are still unidentified to this day. McKinlay reported this to the government, and soon afterwards learned that the remains of Robert O'Hara Burke and William John Wills had also been found. McKinlay decided to explore in the direction of Central Mount Stuart, but was driven back by heavy rains and floods. McKinlay then decided to make for the Gulf of Carpentaria, hoping to find HMVS Victoria which had been sent to meet Burke's party. By 20 May 1862 the shore of the Gulf was thought to be only around five miles (8 km) away, but the intervening country was very difficult, and it was decided to turn east and make for Port Denison on the north Queensland coast. A station on the Bowen River near Port Denison was reached on 2 August 1862, and after resting a few days the expedition reached Port Denison. The party then returned by sea to Adelaide. McKinlay received a grant of £1000 from the government and a gold watch from the Royal Geographical Society of England.

Mid-life and Northern Territory exploration

On 17 January 1863 McKinlay married Jane Pile (c. 1837 – 14 February 1914), a daughter of James Pile (c. 1799 – 19 March 1885) an old friend and father of pastoralist and horse trainer John Pile, but was soon off exploring again. In September 1865 he was chosen to lead a party of twelve to explore the Northern Territory and to find a more suitable site for settlement than Escape Cliffs, to which B. T. Finniss had staked his reputation, and was proving a costly embarrassment. It was an exceptionally rainy season and while on the East Alligator River the expedition was surrounded by flood waters. With great resource McKinlay, having killed his horses, constructed a raft with their hides and saplings and with Edmunds and his party made a perilous journey to the coast. McKinlay reported favourably on the country around Port Darwin and Anson Bay as being suitable for settlement.

Late life

After his return to South Australia from the Northern Territory in 1866, McKinlay took up pastoral pursuits near the town of Gawler, South Australia. John McKinlay died in Gawler on 31 December 1872. McKinlay was buried in the Willaston General Cemetery, with his wife Jane Pile, who died later in 1914. A monument to John McKinlay's memory was erected on the main street of Gawler, Murray Street, in 1875.

Notes

References
Lockwood, Kim, Big John: The Extraordinary Adventures of John McKinlay, 1819–1872, State Library of Victoria, 1995.

External links
 
 
 

Explorers of Australia
Explorers of South Australia
Australian people of Scottish descent
1819 births
1872 deaths